Khaled al-Ayoubi is a former Syrian diplomat. On 30 July 2012, he informed the Britain's Foreign Office that he left his post as Chargé d'Affaires in the Syrian embassy in London. He was the most senior Syrian diplomat left in London after the British government forced embassy staff to leave in May. Al-Ayoubi claimed that he left because he was unable to: "represent a regime that has committed such violent and oppressive acts against its own people", according to an interview. His departure was characterized as another blow to the Syrian government. It is reported that both he and his family are at a safe location in London.

From-top syrian diplomat to budgie-breeder

https://www.facebook.com/stargatealayoubi

References

Year of birth missing (living people)
Living people
2012 in Syria
People of the Syrian civil war
Syrian defectors
Syrian diplomats
Al-Ayoubi family
https://www.yorkshirepost.co.uk/news/latest-news/from-top-syrian-diplomat-to-barnsley-budgie-breeder-how-life-has-changed-for-khaled-al-ayoubi-1-9594954